The 1999 Berlin Marathon was the 26th running of the annual marathon race held in Berlin, Germany, held on 26 September 1999. Kenya's Josephat Kiprono won the men's race in 2:06:44 hours, while the women's race was won by his compatriot Tegla Loroupe in 2:20:43, which lowered her own marathon world record by four seconds.

Results

Men

Women

References 

 Results. Association of Road Racing Statisticians. Retrieved 2020-04-02.

External links 
 Official website

1999 in Berlin
Berlin Marathon
Berlin Marathon
Berlin Marathon
Berlin Marathon